Raymond Richards (born 18 May 1946) is an Australian former football (soccer) midfielder. He was a member of the Australian 1974 World Cup squad in West Germany and represented the country 31 times in total for 5 goals between 1967 and 1975 as well as representing Queensland and New South Wales.

Playing career

Club career
Richards started his football career at the semi-professional club Croydon F.C. in London, England. At the age of 16 in 1963, he was offered a professional contract with Leyton Orient F.C., but decided to emigrate to Australia, to play with the Latrobe Soccer Club, based in Brisbane. In 1968, he moved to Hollandia Soccer Club, also in Brisbane, then in 1969 he moved to Sydney to play for Sydney Croatia in Division 1 (at that time, the top tier in the New South Wales competition), before moving to the Marconi club in Division 2 for the rest of that season. Marconi was then promoted to Division 1 after winning the Division 2 premiership in 1969. Richards continued playing for the club, up to and including the first year of the National Soccer League in 1977. In 1979 Richards played four matches for Sydney club APIA Leichhardt.

International career
In all Richards played 31 times for the Australian national team and scored 5 times from 1967–1975.

1974 World Cup
Richards played in Australia's three matches at the 1974 FIFA World Cup in Germany.
Richards has the dubious honour of being the first Australian to be sent off in a World Cup match, being sent off in the game against Chile in 1974. He actually received two yellow cards but no red card. It wasn't until the reserve official, Clive Thomas, informed the linesman of the mistake four minutes after the second yellow card that the referee, Jafar Namdar, realised his mistake and ordered him off the field.

Coaching career
Between 1974 and 1976 Richards acted as a player/coach at Marconi Stallions.

Honours
Richards has been designated as Socceroo #199 and has been inducted as a member of the Football Federation Australia Football Hall of Fame.

References

1946 births
Living people
English emigrants to Australia
English footballers
Australian soccer players
Australia international soccer players
Australian expatriate sportspeople in England
1974 FIFA World Cup players
Sydney United 58 FC players
Association football midfielders